Sarah Ashleigh Gunning (born April 25, 1985) is an American retired soccer forward who most recently played for Kvarnsvedens IK in the 2012–2013 seasons.  She previously played for Norwegian club Arna-Bjørnar in the Toppserien, Adelaide United in the Australian W-League and magicJack in the WPS.

References

Living people
1987 births
American women's soccer players
MagicJack (WPS) players
Arna-Bjørnar players
American expatriate women's soccer players
Expatriate women's soccer players in Australia
Expatriate footballers in Sweden
Expatriate women's footballers in Norway
Eskilstuna United DFF players
Women's association football forwards
American expatriate sportspeople in Norway
Toppserien players
LSU Tigers women's soccer players
Coastal Carolina Chanticleers women's soccer players
American expatriate sportspeople in Australia
American expatriate sportspeople in Sweden
Women's Professional Soccer players
Charlotte Lady Eagles players
USL W-League (1995–2015) players